Perpetual Income & Growth Investment Trust was a large British investment trust dedicated to investments in UK equities. Established in 1996, the company was a constituent of the FTSE 250 Index. The chairman was Richard Laing. The fund was managed by Invesco Perpetual. Murray Income Trust absorbed 80% of its assets in November 2020. The other 20% was distributed to shareholders.

References

External links
  Official site

Financial services companies established in 1996
Investment trusts of the United Kingdom